Reinaldo de Morais Peres (born 22 May 1980), commonly known as Reinaldo Gaúcho, is a Brazilian footballer who currently plays as a forward for Hong Kong First Division club Wong Tai Sin.

Club career
Reinaldo Gaúcho joined then-Série C side Treze in January 2012, having spent time with numerous Brazilian clubs, as well as Santa Clara of Portugal and Anhui Jiufang of China. He did not stay long, and by March of the same year, he had left to join Centro Sportivo Alagoano. The Maceió-based side had planned to loan him to a club in Korea, but the player could not agree personal terms and the deal fell through.

After a short spell with 14 de Julho, Reinaldo joined Parnahyba, but only made one appearance before leaving for Itabaiana.

After just one Copa do Brasil game, Reinaldo moved to Hong Kong, joining Sun Hei in 2013.

He joined Yuen Long on loan from Eastern in 2015, having suffered an injury that kept him out of action the previous season, before signing permanently the next season.

In April 2018, he joined Macau side Cheng Fung and scored the first goal in his debut match.

Career statistics

Club

Notes

References

External links
 Profile at HKFA
 

1980 births
Living people
Brazilian footballers
Brazilian expatriate footballers
Association football forwards
Esporte Clube Passo Fundo players
Esporte Clube Vitória players
Londrina Esporte Clube players
Sociedade Esportiva e Recreativa Caxias do Sul players
C.D. Santa Clara players
Clube Esportivo Lajeadense players
Grêmio Esportivo Brasil players
Clube Atlético Taquaritinga players
Esporte Clube Internacional players
Clube Atlético Metropolitano players
Futebol Clube Santa Cruz players
Treze Futebol Clube players
Centro Sportivo Alagoano players
Sun Hei SC players
Hong Kong Rangers FC players
Hong Kong Premier League players
Hong Kong First Division League players
Brazilian expatriate sportspeople in Portugal
Expatriate footballers in Portugal
Brazilian expatriate sportspeople in China
Expatriate footballers in China
Brazilian expatriate sportspeople in Hong Kong
Expatriate footballers in Hong Kong